Francis Gonzalez (born 6 February 1952 in Bordeaux) is a retired French middle- and long-distance runner. He represented his country at the 1972 and 1976 Summer Olympics. In addition, he won medals at the 1972 and 1973 European Indoor Championships.

International competitions

Personal bests
Outdoor
800 metres – 1:47.1 (Colombes 1972)
1000 metres – 2:18.0 (Nice 1978)
1500 metres – 3:36.2 (Paris 1979)
One mile – 3:53.02 (Lausanne 1981)
2000 metres – 4:58.1 (Rennes 1979)
3000 metres – 7:41.00 (Lausanne 1979)
5000 metres – 13:20.24 (Stockholm 1979)
10,000 metres – 28:26.04 (Paris 1984)
Half marathon – 1:03:34 (Paris 1987)
Indoor
800 metres – 1:49.17 (Grenoble 1972)
1500 metres – 3:39.3 (Dortmund 1978)
3000 metres – 7:51.9 (Vienna 1979)

References

External links
All-Athletics profile 

1952 births
Living people
Sportspeople from Bordeaux
French male middle-distance runners
French male long-distance runners
Athletes (track and field) at the 1972 Summer Olympics
Athletes (track and field) at the 1976 Summer Olympics
Olympic athletes of France
20th-century French people